Jack D. Fouts (September 8, 1925 – March 1, 2012) was an American football player and coach.  He served as the head football coach at Ohio Wesleyan University from 1964 to 1983 and at Cornell University in 1989, compiling a career college football record of 80–100–9.  Fouts died on March 1, 2012.

Head coaching record

References

External links
 

1925 births
2012 deaths
Bowling Green Falcons football coaches
Cornell Big Red football coaches
Michigan Wolverines football coaches
Ohio Wesleyan Battling Bishops football coaches
Ohio Wesleyan Battling Bishops football players
High school football coaches in Ohio
Players of American football from Akron, Ohio